Sir James Hugh Buchanan Coates (9 October 1851 – 11 October 1935) was a New Zealand banker and keen sportsman. He was the general manager of the National Bank of New Zealand for 21 years before retiring from that role in 1914, moving to London and becoming a company director.

Early life and sporting interests
Coates was born in George's Bay, Auckland, New Zealand, on 9 October 1851. His father, James Coates, was a prominent pioneer settler of Auckland and a senior official within the administration of the newly established colony.

Coates was educated at the Church of England Grammar School and St John's College, Auckland. With an athletic build, from a young age he was a keen cricketer, played rugby football, rowed and was an excellent shot-putter. Later he played golf, enjoyed horse-racing and was one of the founders of the Auckland Cricket Association and the Auckland Amateur Athletic and Cycle Club.

Banking career
In 1869, he was employed by the Bank of New South Wales, for which he worked in both Auckland and Thames, before becoming a teller with the National Bank of New Zealand in Auckland in 1873. He became an accountant in 1875 and manager in 1886, before being appointed general manager of the bank in 1893. After retiring as general manager in 1914 he became a director of the bank at its head office in London. He was also a director of the South British Insurance Company (from 1922 until his death), the Guardian Trust and Executors Company, and he was a valued financial adviser to the Government of New Zealand.

Honours and awards
Coates was appointed a Knight Bachelor in the 1922 New Year Honours. In 1935, he was awarded the King George V Silver Jubilee Medal.

Death
Coates never married. He died at 84 years of age at his home in St Stephen's Avenue, Parnell, Auckland, on 11 October 1935, after developing bronchial pneumonia. He was buried at Purewa Cemetery in the Auckland suburb of Meadowbank.

At the annual meeting of the South British Insurance Company on 24 October 1935 the chairman of directors, Victor Larner, said of Coates:

References

1851 births
1935 deaths
New Zealand sportsmen
New Zealand bankers
New Zealand Knights Bachelor
New Zealand expatriates in England
Businesspeople awarded knighthoods
Burials at Purewa Cemetery
Businesspeople from Auckland